Martin Tichý (born 13 July 1968) is a Czech rower. He competed in the men's quadruple sculls event at the 1988 Summer Olympics.

References

External links
 

1968 births
Living people
Czech male rowers
Olympic rowers of Czechoslovakia
Rowers at the 1988 Summer Olympics
People from Mělník District
Sportspeople from the Central Bohemian Region